Out The Box is the first live album and third major release by American Gospel music singer Tonéx. It was recorded Live on September 19, 2003, at The San Diego Civic Theater. The single "Work On Me" reached #3 on Billboard's Hot Gospel Songs chart. "Out the Box" is Certified Platinum selling well over 980,000 copies.

Background
On September 19, 2003, at 2:30 P.M., over 400 people were already lined up outside the San Diego Civic Theatre for the Out the Box live recording. The recording did not start until 8:00 P.M. that evening. The anticipation was high for Tonéx's first live recording. An over capacity crowd of over 3,500 people stood shrieking with applause, eagerly awaiting Tonéx to emerge from a 9-foot tall music box. From that point...it was on! Tonéx and a multicultural 40-voice choir called The Peculiar People, a seven piece band, three piece horn section, and four dancers mesmerized the audience for over three hours. They did their best to capture what happened that night. The screams you hear are real, not added. The anointing they experienced that night was real, not contrived.

Track listing
Disc 1

 Yolanda Adams Introduction
 Overture
 Out the Box
 The Trust Theory
 Alive (Not Dead)
 Alive 2
 Fundamentals
 Work On Me
 Games
 Endangered Species
 The Children's Bread
 Freestyle — Church Floor
 Real With U (Live)
 Taxi Overture
 Taxi (Live)
 Personal Jesus (Live)
 Why? (Live)
 God Has Not 4Got (Live) (Piano by Kirk Franklin)
 To Know You Lord (Live)
 God Is Love
 Ain't

Disc 2
 Nureau Ink
 Believer
 Todos Juntos (featuring Sheila E.)
 Your Word (featuring Morpheus)
 Freestyle - Throneroom
 The Spirit Realm
 Freestyle — Worship
 Make Me Over
 The Truth
 Since Jesus Came (featuring Kirk Franklin)
 Out The Box (Outro)
 Syng
 Doesn't Really Matter (featuring Applejaxx)
 Thank Q
 Closing Interview

Personnel
Instrumentalists
Organ and Additional Keys: Marcus "Panda Bear" Hodges
Keys and Colors: Shaun Martin
Piano and Fender Rhodes: Dwayne Swan
Key Bass: Jay "Mathematics" Deal
Guitars: Tim Stewart
Bass: Chris "Worldwide" Pottinger
Drums: Robert "Sput" Seawright
CrazyHornz: Randolph Ellis III (Sax), Ray Montiro (Trumpet), Gary Smith (Trombone)
Featured Percussion: Sheila E. on Todos Juntos
Featured Piano: Kirk Franklin on God Has Not 4got

The Peculiar People
Sopranos: Yvette Williams, Vernice Burroughs, Myrna Elguezabal, Bianca Alverez, Bonita Bankhead, Zerina Shepherd, Eva Carmarillo, Libna Cazares, Deborah Gonzalez, Ester Ortega, Tamara Rae, Miriam Suarez, Carmen Verduzco, Brenda Zavala, Bridgette Newman
Tenors: Damion "D-Willy" Willis, Jason Brown, Enoch Ruiz Jr., Josue Anguiano, Victor Duarte Jr., Cedric Baltrip, Mike "B." Burroughs, Felipe Gutierrez III, Jacob Herrera, Josh Herrera, Richard Ramirez, Ronnie Rey, Dannie "Doe-nay" Rivera, Alfonso Rivera, Arturo San Vicente
Altos: Amber Carter, Giovanni Oats, Fretrice Ewell Knox, Crystal Duarte, Yesinia Calderon, Tiffany Cross, Leah Hendrix, Francesca Hiuzar, Alina Perez, Merari Torresday, Melina Rivera, Joanna Saldago, Abigail "Abby" Sotelo, Sonya Vasquez, Karina Torreseday

Dancers
Paul Michael Reed
K.J. Gonzales
Samath Orm
Erik Sarapudon

References

Tonéx albums
2004 live albums